Pasiene Parish was an administrative unit of the now defunct Ludza District in Latvia. As a result of the 2009 administrative divisions reform of Latvia, Lauderi Parish was absorbed by Zilupe Municipality. Since 1 July 2021, Lauderi Parish is part of Ludza Municipality.

Towns, villages and settlements of Pasiene parish 
 Pasiene

References

Ludza Municipality
Parishes of Latvia
Latgale